William Paton (1 August 1925 – 2005) was a Scottish footballer who played for Rangers and Ayr United. He played as a forward.

Paton joined Rangers from junior side Kirkintilloch Rob Roy in 1943 during World War II, but did not make his competitive debut until September 1947. During his spell at Ibrox he made 175 appearances across all competitions and scored 75 goals. He was part of the squad in the 'treble' season of 1948–49. He collected two League championship winner's medals, one in the Scottish Cup (1953), one in the Scottish League Cup and two in the Glasgow Cup.

He should not be confused with his namesake William J. Paton, a wing-half who played for Motherwell around the same time.

References 

Ayr United F.C. players
Rangers F.C. players
Scottish Football League players
Scottish footballers
Footballers from Glasgow
Scottish soldiers
British Army soldiers
1925 births
2005 deaths
Kirkintilloch Rob Roy F.C. players
Association football scouts
St Mirren F.C. non-playing staff
Date of death missing
Place of death missing
Association football inside forwards
Scottish Junior Football Association players